Caroline O'Shea may refer to:

 Caroline O'Shea (Big Brother), a contestant on the TV show Big Brother
 Caroline O'Shea (athlete) (born 1960), Irish middle-distance runner